Thomas Patrick Bolger (18 July 1904 – 16 June 1995) was a wrestler who represent Australia at the 1928 Summer Olympics.

Bolger competed in the freestyle middleweight contest at the 1928 Summer Olympics held in Amsterdam, Bolger lost in his first round contest against Swiss wrestler Ernst Kyburz and this was followed by another defeat against Anton Praeg from South Africa.

References

1904 births
1995 deaths
Olympic wrestlers of Australia
Wrestlers at the 1928 Summer Olympics
Australian male sport wrestlers